Portia is an inner satellite of Uranus. It was discovered from the images taken by Voyager 2 on 3 January 1986, and was given the temporary designation S/1986 U 1. The moon is named after Portia, the heroine of William Shakespeare's play The Merchant of Venice. It is also designated Uranus XII.

Portia is the second-largest inner satellite of Uranus after Puck. The Portian orbit, which lies inside Uranus' synchronous orbital radius, is slowly decaying due to tidal deceleration. The moon will one day either break up into a planetary ring or hit Uranus.

It heads a group of satellites called the Portia Group, which includes Bianca, Cressida, Desdemona, Juliet, Rosalind, Cupid, Belinda and Perdita. These satellites have similar orbits and photometric properties.

Little is known about Portia beyond its size of about 140 km in diameter, orbit, and geometric albedo of about 0.08.

In the Voyager 2 images, Portia appears as an elongated object whose major axis points towards Uranus. The ratio of axes of the Portia's prolate spheroid is 0.8 ± 0.1. Its surface is grey in color. Observations with Hubble Space Telescope and large terrestrial telescopes found water ice absorption features in the spectrum of Portia.

Gallery

See also 

 Moons of Uranus

References 

Explanatory notes

Citations

External links 
 Portia Profile by NASA's Solar System Exploration
 Uranus' Known Satellites (by Scott S. Sheppard)

Moons of Uranus
19860103
Moons with a prograde orbit
The Merchant of Venice